The 1995–96 Fussball Club Basel 1893 season was their 103rd season since the club's foundation. Peter Epting was the club's chairman for the fourth period. FC Basel played their home games in the St. Jakob Stadium. Following their promotion in the 1993–94 season this was their second season back in the highest tier of Swiss football.

Overview

Pre-season
Claude Andrey was again the club's manager, this was his third period as head-coach. However, due to a poor start to the season, he lost his job during October. Oldrich Svab then took over on an interim basis, until Karl Engel was appointed as new head-coach. There were a few players that left the squad. Mart van Duren retired from active football, Martin Jeitziner also retired from professional football and moved on to Old Boys, Ralph Steingruber moved onto St. Gallen, Asif Šarić returned to Germany and joined Sportfreunde Siegen and Thomas Karrer was on loan to Grenchen.

The club's priority aim for the season was to remain in the top flight of Swiss football. Therefore, the club made a number of new signings as the season started, these included the Nigerian national team goalkeeper Ike Shorunmu, who signed in from Shooting Stars, Gabriel Okolosi, who signed in from Africa Sports National, and Alex Nyarko, who came from Sportul. Another promising player was Vilmar who signed in from Ferroviária. David Orlando was signed in from Sion, the young Bruno Sutter from Young Fellows Zürich and Daniele Moro signed in from Xamax. Further, large number of youngsters were brought up from the youth team to train with the first team squad.

Domestic league
The reform of the Nationalliga had been completed the previous season and the top two divisions were each contested by 12 teams. In the first stage, both divisions would play a qualification round. In the second stage the top eight teams of the Nationalliga A would play a championship round, with half the points from the first stage as bonus. The top four teams from the Nationalliga B would play a promotion/relegation round with the bottom four teams from Nationalliga A. However, there was one change at the start of the 1995–96 Nationalliga A season and that was that the Swiss Football Association introduced the three points for a win standard. This had been introduced by the FA in England in 1981, but did not attract much use elsewhere until it was used in the 1994 World Cup finals. In 1995, FIFA formally adopted the system, and it subsequently became standard in international tournaments, as well as most national football leagues. 

The season started well for Basel, three wins in the first four games. But then, between the sixth and sixteenth round Basel suffered eight defeats in 11 games. It was at this point that Claude Andrey lost his job as head-coach, but the reasons were not just of sporting nature. Oldrich Svab took over on an interim basis on 28 October and until Karl Engel was appointed as new head-coach. The team caught themselves and qualified for the championship round. In the 22 games, Basel won nine, drew three and suffered ten defeats, scoring just 23 goals conceding 29. The team had collected 30 points and they were three points above the dividing line. In the championship round Basel did not record a victory until the ninth round, but they finished the season in sixth position and thus qualified for the 1996 UEFA Intertoto Cup. In the league they managed just three victories, four draws and suffered seven defeats, with just eleven goals for and 20 conceded. Alexandre Rey was the team's top league goal scorer and Hakan Yakin was second placed with five goals.

Swiss Cup
Basel entered the Swiss Cup in the third round. Here they defeated the lower tier club Subingen 6–1 and Alexandre Rey scored four goals. In the fourth and fifth round they defeated lower tier clubs Gossau 3–1 and Biel-Bienne 4–1. Thus Basel advanced to the quarter-finals and here they travelled to la Maladière in Neuchâtel, but were knocked out of the cup by Xamax 2–1 after extra time. Sion won the cup, beating Servette 3–2 in the final.

UEFA Intertoto Cup
In the 1995 UEFA Intertoto Cup Basel managed a home win against Sheffield Wednesday and an away win in Poland against Górnik Zabrze. But the other two games ended with defeats, at home against the Karlsruher SC and an away game against Aarhus GF. As group winners Karlsruhe continued to the next round.

Players 
The following is the list of the Basel first team squad. It also includes players that were in the squad on the day that the season started on 24 June 1995 but subsequently left the club after that date.

 
 
 
 

 

 
 

 

 
 

 

 

 

Players who left the squad

Results 
Legend

Friendly matches

Pre- and mid-season

Winter break

Nationalliga A

Qualifying Phase

League table

Championship Group

League table

Swiss Cup

Intertoto Cup

Group 1

League table

See also
 History of FC Basel
 List of FC Basel players
 List of FC Basel seasons

References

Sources
 Rotblau: Jahrbuch Saison 2015/2016. Publisher: FC Basel Marketing AG. 
 Die ersten 125 Jahre / 2018. Publisher: Josef Zindel im Friedrich Reinhardt Verlag, Basel. 
 The FCB squad 1995–96 at fcb-archiv.ch
 1995–96 at Joggeli.ch
 1995–96 at RSSSF

External links
 FC Basel official site

FC Basel seasons
Basel